Flatzbour (Luxembourgish: Flatzbuer or Flatzbur) is a village in northwestern Luxembourg.

It is situated in the commune of Rambrouch and has a population of 22.

References 

Villages in Luxembourg